
Lago di Lucendro is a reservoir at the St. Gotthard Pass in the municipality of Airolo of the canton of Ticino, Switzerland. The dam Lucendro with a height of 73 m was completed in 1947.

See also
List of lakes of Switzerland
List of mountain lakes of Switzerland

Lucendro
Lucendro
LLucendro